Gudesteus ( or ;  or ) is a given name of Germanic origin. It was common in the northwest of the Iberia peninsula in the tenth and eleventh centuries. In one document from 1001 it was given the spelling Gaudesteo. It may refer to:
Gudesteus (bishop of Oviedo)
Gudesteus (bishop of Iria)

Gudesteo González, captured at the Battle of Morella

Notes